Hongmiao station is a station under construction on Line 14 and Pinggu line (Line 22) of the Beijing Subway.

Description 
Hongmiao station will be an interchange station between Line 14 and Pinggu line (Line 22). It will open in 2025.

Station layout 
This station will have a side platform.

References 

Railway stations under construction in China
Beijing Subway stations in Chaoyang District